Pseudotropheus longior is a species of cichlid endemic to Lake Malawi where it is only known from Mbamba Bay in Tanzania at depths of from .  This species can reach a length of  SL.  It can also be found in the aquarium trade.

References

External links 
 Photograph

longior
longior
Freshwater fish of Tanzania
Fish described in 1996
Taxa named by Lothar Seegers
Taxonomy articles created by Polbot
Taxobox binomials not recognized by IUCN